Hojjatabad (also Romanized as Ḩojjatābād) is a village in Kabutarsorkh Rural District, in the Central District of Chadegan County, Isfahan Province, Iran. At the 2006 census, its population was 992, in 269 families.

References 

Populated places in Chadegan County